Hans Jørgen Hurum (20 May 1906 – 13 May 2001) was a Norwegian music critic and non-fiction writer. He graduated as cand.jur. in 1929. He was a music critic for the newspaper Norges Handels- og Sjøfartstidende from 1932 to 1939, and for Aftenposten from 1946 to 1982.

Selected works

References

1906 births
2001 deaths
Writers from Oslo
Norwegian music critics